Maria Semczyszak (born 21 March 1932 in Andrzejówka) was a Polish luger who competed during the 1950s. She won the gold medal in the women's singles event at the 1958 FIL World Luge Championships in Krynica, Poland.

References
Hickok sports information on World champions in luge and skeleton.

1932 births
Polish female lugers
Living people
People from Nowy Sącz County
Sportspeople from Lesser Poland Voivodeship